The 1990 William & Mary Tribe football team represented the College of William & Mary as an independent during the 1990 NCAA Division I-AA football season. Led by Jimmye Laycock in his 11th year as head coach, William & Mary finished the season with a record of 10–3 and ranked No. 7 in the final NCAA Division I-AA Football Committee poll. The Tribe qualified for the NCAA Division I-AA playoffs, beating UMass in the first round before losing to UCF in the quarterfinals.

Schedule

References

William and Mary
William & Mary Tribe football seasons
William and Mary Indians football